James Christian Albus (born June 18, 1940) is an American professional golfer.

Albus was born in Staten Island, New York. He attended New Dorp High School, and went on to Bucknell University, where he was a successful baseball player. It was while he was at college that he took up golf, which was unusually late for a future pro. He transferred to UCLA and graduated in 1965.

Albus became a golf professional in 1968 and worked as a club professional at courses that included La Tourette Golf Course and Piping Rock Club. He won a number of local and regional tournaments while he was a club professional and played in five U.S. Opens and seven PGA Championships. He was Met PGA Player of the Year in 1981, 1982, 1986 and 1988. Albus' greatest success came after he turned 50 and began playing on the Senior PGA Tour, now known as the PGA Tour Champions, where he has won six tournaments, including a senior major, the 1991 Senior Players Championship.

Albus has been inducted into the Staten Island Sports Hall of Fame as well as the PGA Metropolitan Section Hall of Fame.  He played his last event associated with the PGA Tour organization in 2009.

Professional wins (19)

Regular career wins (11)
1970 Metropolitan Open
1975 Long Island PGA Championship
1976 Long Island PGA Championship
1978 New York State Open
1981 Metropolitan PGA Championship, Long Island PGA Championship
1982 Metropolitan PGA Championship
1984 Metropolitan Open
1986 Long Island PGA Championship
1987 Long Island Open
1988 Long Island Open

Senior PGA Tour wins (6)

Senior PGA Tour playoff record (0–3)

Other senior wins (2)
2001 Georgia-Pacific Super Seniors Match-Play Championship, Liberty Mutual Legends of Golf - Legendary Division (with Simon Hobday)

Results in major championships

Timeline

Note: Albus never played in the Masters Tournament nor The Open Championship.

CUT = missed 36 hole cut
"T" = tied

Results in senior major championships

Wins (1)

Timeline
Results may not be in chronological order.

''Note: The Senior British Open Championship did not become a major until 2003.

CUT = missed the halfway cut
"T" indicates a tie for a place

U.S. national team appearances
PGA Cup: 1977 (tie), 1981 (tie), 1982 (winners)

See also

References

External links

American male golfers
PGA Tour Champions golfers
Winners of senior major golf championships
Golfers from New York (state)
Bucknell University alumni
University of California, Los Angeles alumni
Sportspeople from Staten Island
Sportspeople from Sarasota, Florida
1940 births
Living people